Edgar "Injap" Jaruda Sia II (born 1977) is a Filipino businessman. He is the chairman of DoubleDragon Properties (a joint business venture with Tony Tan Caktiong), and the founder of the Mang Inasal fast food restaurant chain. 

In 2011, Sia become the youngest billionaire in the Philippines at the age of 34 after selling his 70% stake in Mang Inasal to Jollibee. As of September 2021, his net worth was estimated at US$675 million.

Early life
Sia was born in Iloilo City in 1977 and grew up in Roxas City, the eldest of three siblings having parents from both Capiz and Iloilo. He was nicknamed "Injap", a portmanteau of "Intsik" (the Filipino/Tagalog term for Chinese) and "Japanese"; as his father, Edgar Sr., is half Chinese, while his mother, the former Pacita Jaruda, is half Japanese (Japanese surname Haruda, 春田).

Sia had planned to become an architect, but dropped out of the University of San Agustin to start a business.

Career
Sia co-founded the barbecue chain Mang Inasal in Iloilo City in 2003. In seven years, Mang Inasal grew to 338 branches nationwide, before being acquired by Jollibee in 2010.

In 2009, Sia founded Injap Land Corporation (now DoubleDragon Properties Corporation), developer of CityMall chain of malls. 

In 2014, DoubleDragon Properties became a public company. DoubleDragon has been developing commercial and residential properties and reportedly plans to build 100 malls by 2020. 

In August 2016, the company announced it was acquiring a majority stake in Hotel of Asia, Inc.

Personal life
Edgar Sia is married to Shella Sia, and they have three children Edgar Sia III, John Henry Sia and Elisa Stephanie Sia. They live in Manila, Philippines.

References

1977 births
Living people
Filipino billionaires
Filipino chairpersons of corporations
Filipino company founders
People from Iloilo City
People from Capiz
Filipino people of Chinese descent
Filipino people of Japanese descent
Visayan people